Partek Ski Lifts, commonly known as Partek, is a chairlift manufacturer based in Pine Island, New York. It was founded in 1996 as the successor to Borvig, who went out of business in 1993. The company was founded by Hagen Schulz, the son of Borvig's President Gary Schulz. The company was also the official parts distributor for Borvig lifts.

In 2004, Partek had announced that it was developing a detachable chairlift system, however, development was ceased when the company was purchased in 2005. The company's designs were purchased by Doppelmayr CTEC and a non-compete agreement regarding new installations using the designs was established. Also included in the purchase were Partek's rights to Borvig lifts. After the purchase, Partek president Hagen Schulz became a sales consultant at Doppelmayr CTEC, and started a new company, Ski Lift Parts Inc.

The five-year non-compete agreement expired in 2009 and Partek resumed installation of new lifts using its designs.

Between 1996 and 2005, Partek installed 24 lifts in North America.  Starting in 2009, Partek has installed over nine additional lifts and continues to service Borvig installation.

References

External links
Brief description of Partek
Website of Partek parts company

Aerial lift manufacturers
Companies established in 1996